Charles-François-Jean-Baptiste Moreau de Commagny (Paris, 1783 – Paris, 1 July 1832) was a French playwright, librettist, poet and chansonnier.

His plays, sometimes signed with different names (C.-F.-J.-B. Moreau, C.-A. Moreau, A. Moreau, Eustache Lasticot or simply M), were presented on the most important Parisian stages of his time: (Théâtre du Vaudeville, Théâtre du Palais-Royal, Gymnase dramatique, Théâtre des Variétés, etc.)

Works 

1801: Les Portraits au salon, ou le Mariage imprévu, comédie en vaudeville in 1 act, with Michel-Nicolas Balisson de Rougemont, 
1801: La Vaccine, folie-vaudeville in 1 act and in prose, with Théophile Marion Dumersan
1802: Les Amours de la halle, vaudeville poissard in 1 act, with Charles Henrion
1802: Allons en Russie, vaudeville épisodique in 1 act, with Henrion
1803: Cassandre aveugle, ou le Concert d'Arlequin, comédie-parade in 1 act, mingled with vaudevilles, with René de Chazet and Dumersan
1803: Cassandre huissier, comédie-parade in 1 act, mingled with vaudevilles, with Henrion
1804: Le Dansomane de la rue Quincampoix, ou le Bal interrompu, folie-vaudeville in 1 act, with Joseph Servières
1804: La Manie de l'indépendance, ou Scapin tout seul, monologue in prose, mingled with vaudeville, with Dumersan
1804: Ossian cadet, ou les Guimbardes, parodie des Bardes, vaudeville in 3 acts, with Dupaty and Chazet
1804: Les Vélocifères, comédie parade in 1 act, with de Chazet and Dupaty
1805: Les Chevilles de Maître Adam menuisier de Nevers ou les Poètes artisans, with Francis
1805: La Nouvelle Nouveauté, comédie épisodique in 1 act, in prose, mingled with vaudevilles, with Lafortelle
1805: Les Femmes colères, entertainment in 1 act, in prose, mingled with vaudevilles, with Emmanuel Dupaty and Francis, 1805
1806: La Nuit d'auberge, comedy in 1 act and in prose, mingled with vaudevilles
1806: Gallet, ou le Chansonnier droguiste, comedy in 1 act, in prose, mingled with vaudevilles, with Francis
1806: Voltaire chez Ninon, historical event in 1 act and in prose, mingled with vaudevilles, with Lafortelle
1807: Une journée chez Bancelin, comedy in 1 act, in prose, mingled with vaudevilles, withFrancis
1807: Le Panorama de Momus, inauguration prologue, in prose and vaudevilles, for the new hall of the Théâtre des Variétés, with Francis and Désaugiers
1807: Les Bateliers du Niémen, vaudeville in 1 act, in prose, with Marc-Antoine Désaugiers and Francis baron d'Allarde
1808: Les Avant-postes du maréchal de Saxe, comedy in 1 act and in prose, mingled with vaudevilles, with Henri-François Dumolard
1808: Poisson chez Colbert, comedy, with Lafortelle
1808: Haine aux hommes, comedy in 1 act, mingled with vaudevilles, with Francis
1808: Mincétoff, parody of Menzikoff, with Desaugiers and Francis
1808 Le Bouquet impromptu, presented to the prince archi-chancelier of the Empire, on 24 June 1808, jour de Saint-Jean
1808: Taconnet chez Ramponneau, ou le Réveillon de la courtille, comedy foly in 1 act, in prose mingled with couplets, with Francis and Désaugiers
1809: Le Petit Courrier ou Comme les femmes se vengent, comedy in 2 acts, in prose, mingled with vaudevilles, with Jean-Nicolas Bouilly
1809: Madame Favart, comedy in 1 act, in prose, mingled with vaudevilles, with Dumolard
1809: Un tour de Colalto, comedy in 1 act, in prose, mingled with vaudevilles, with Dumolard
1810: Boileau à Auteuil, comedy in 1 act and in prose, minfled with vaudevilles, with Francis
1810: Une visite à Saint-Cyr
1810: Relâche pour la répétition générale de Fernand Cortez, ou le Grand opéra en province, parody in 1 act, with Rougemont and Merle
1810: Les Époux de trois jours, ou J'enlève ma femme, comedy in 2 acts, in prose, mingled with vaudevilles, with Ourry
1810: Les Sabotiers béarnais, ou la Faute d'orthographe, vaudeville in 1 act, in prose, with Chavagnac
1811: L'Exil de Rochester ou la Taverne, comédie anecdotique in 1 act, in prose, mingled with vaudevilles, with Dumolard
1811: La Petite Gouvernante, comedy in 2 acts and in prose, mingled with vaudevilles, with Michel-Joseph Gentil de Chavagnac
1812: L'Anglais à Bagdad, comédie-anecdote in 1 act, in prose, mingled with de vaudevilles, with Maurice Ourry and Emmanuel Théaulon
1812: Jérusalem déshabillée, with Ourry and Théaulon
1812: Paris volant, ou la Fabrique d'ailes, folie-épisodique en 1 act, in prose and in vaudevilles, with Ourry and Théaulon
1812: La Chevalière d'Éon, ou les Parieurs anglais, comedy in 1 act, in prose, mingled with vaudevilles, with Ourry
1813: Le Château d'If, comedy in 1 act and in vaudevilles
1813: Tout pour l'enseigne, ou la Manie du jour, vaudeville in 1 act, with Lafortelle, Nicolas Brazier and Merle
1814: Monsieur Crouton, ou l'Aspirant au salon, pièce grivoise in 1 act, with Lafortelle and Francis
1814: Le Voile d'Angleterre, ou la Revendeuse à la toilette, comédie en vaudevilles in 1 act
1815: La Bouquetière anglaise, comédie-anecdote ei 1 acti, in prose, mingled with vaudevilles
1815: Le Cordier de Samarcande, ou Tout tient au bonheur, comedy in 1 act, in prose, mingled with couplets, with Lafortelle
1815: Le Vaudeville en vendanges, petit à-propos villageois in 1 act, mingled with couplets, with Désaugiers and Chavagnac
1816: Les Caméléons, comédie en vaudevilles in 1 act, in prose, with Pierre-Jean de Béranger
1816: Les Visites bourgeoises, ou le Dehors et le dedans, short sketch of a large tableau, in 1 act, mingled with couplets, with Désaugiers and Chavagnac
1817: Les Deux Gaspard, comédie en vaudevilles, with Pierre Capelle
1817: Les Deux Précepteurs, comédie en vaudevilles, with Scribe
1818: Baboukin, ou le Sérail en goguette, vaudeville in 1 act, with A.-M. Lafortelle and Jean-Toussaint Merle
1818: Il n'y a plus d'enfants, ou la Journée d'un pensionnat, tableau en vaudevilles, with Pierre-Frédéric-Adolphe Carmouche and Henri Dupin
1818: L'Innocente et le Mirliton, vaudeville grivois in 1 act, with Carmouche and Gabriel de Lurieu
1818: Un second Théâtre-Français, ou le Kaléidoscope théâtral, review in 1 act, mingled with couplets, with Carmouche, Dupin and de Lurieu
1819: La Robe feuille-morte, one-act play, mingled with couplets, with Jean-Baptiste Dubois
1820: Le Sac vert, pot pourri, ou Récit véridique du procès de la reine d'Angleterre
1820: Chansons et poésies diverses
1821: La Femme du sous-préfet, ou le Charlatan, comedy in 1 act, in prose, mingled with couplets, with Sewrin
1821: Les Joueurs, ou la Hausse et la baisse, comedy in 1 act, mingled with couplets, with Francis
1821: Scène ajoutée au Boulevard Bonne-Nouvelle pour l'anniversaire de la naissance de Molière, with Mélesville and Scribe
1822: Le Comédien d'Étampes, with Charles-Augustin Sewrin
1822: Le Garde-moulin, comédie en vaudevilles, with Sewrin
1822: Kabri le sabotier, ou les Chiquenaudes, comédie-féerie in 1 act, mingled with couplets, with Sewrin
1827: Mémoires historiques et littéraires sur F.-J. Talma
1827: Masaniello, historical drama in 4 acts, with Lafortelle7
1829: Le Boulevard Bonne-Nouvelle, prologue in vaudeville, with Mélesville and Eugène Scribe
1829: La Grisette mariée, comédie en vaudevilles in 2 acts, with Armand d'Artois and Louis-Émile Vanderburch
1830: L'Auberge d'Auray, lyrical drama in 1 act, with Jean-Baptiste-Rose-Bonaventure Violet d'Épagny, Ferdinand Hérold and Michele Carafa
1830: Philibert marié, comédie en vaudevilles in 1 act, with Scribe
1831: La Langue musicale, opéra comique in 1 act, with Gabriel de Lurieu
1825: Un mois de fidélité, with Achille d'Artois, posthumous
undated: La Tante Loriot, one-act vaudeville, with Alfred Delacour

Bibliography 
 Antoine-Vincent Arnault, Antoine Jay, Étienne de Jouy, Biographie nouvelle des contemporains, 1824, p. 390 (read line) 
 Pierre-Charles-Tr. Desrochers, Nécrologe de 1832 ou notices historiques sur les hommes les plus marquants, 1833, p. 220
 Joseph Marie Quérard, La Littérature contemporaine, 1834, p. 292-293
 Charles Weiss, Biographie universelle, 1841, p. 286

External links 
 Charles-François-Jean-Baptiste Moreau de Commagny on Data.bnf.fr

19th-century French dramatists and playwrights
French chansonniers
French opera librettists
Writers from Paris
1783 births
1832 deaths